Saint-Cyprien (Languedocien: Sent Çabrian) is a former commune in the Lot department in south-western France. On 1 January 2018, it was merged into the new commune of Lendou-en-Quercy.

History

Legend of the relics of St. Cyprian 
The village's name comes from the name of Cyprian, bishop of Carthage, whose relics are claimed to have been hidden here during two centuries before reportedly transferred to Moissac in 1122.  This information comes from Aymeric de Peyrac in his Chronicle, and in an old lectionary of the abbey of Moissac, quoted by the Gallia Christiana, which says that the relics were transferred to Moissac from a place in the diocese of Cahors called Valles or Les Vaux. Alain de Solminihac probably did not believe the authenticity of the relics.

Before 1790, the parish's name was Saint-Cyprien des Vaux.

Administration
List of mayors since 1793:

Charles Bach
1793-1796
Jean Laroque
1796-1799
Jean Paul Joseph Rayet
1799-1800
Jean Laroque
1800-1821
Duc
1821-1826
Bernard Lacavalerie
1826-1830
Charles Mathieu de Tuller
1830-1832
Pierre Bousquet
1832-1841
Jean Pierre Gautié
1841-1848
Bousquet
1848-1851
Bernard Laroque
1851-1852
Antoine Sourbié
1852-1862
Gauthier J. Pierre Mercadié
1862-1878
Clément Delprat
1878-1884
Louis Verdier
1884-1885
Eugène Mercadié
1885-1919
Armand Mercadié
1919-1948
Henri Chazarin
1948-1953
Gilbert Borredon
1953-1973
Daniel Maury
1973-1989
Jean-Louis Vayssière
1989-2017

See also
Communes of the Lot department

References

Saintcyprien
Lendou-en-Quercy